Our Flag Means Death is an American period romantic comedy television series created by David Jenkins. Set in the early 18th century during the Golden Age of Piracy, the series follows the misadventures of gentleman-turned-pirate Stede Bonnet (Rhys Darby) and his crew aboard the Revenge as they try to make a name for themselves as pirates and cross paths with famed pirate captain Blackbeard (Taika Waititi).

Our Flag Means Death was released on HBO Max from March 3 to 24, 2022. The series premiere ranks among the top five Max Original comedy series launches. It received positive reviews, including praise for its LGBTQ+ representation, and was renewed for a second season in June 2022. In the UK, the series began broadcasting on BBC Two on January 4, 2023, with all episodes available on BBC iPlayer.

Premise
The series is loosely based on the life of Stede Bonnet. In 1717, Captain Bonnet is a member of the landed gentry of Barbados who abandons his comfortable life and family to prove himself as a pirate during the Golden Age of Piracy, despite having no aptitude for the role. Sailing aboard his ship the Revenge, Captain Bonnet and his dysfunctional crew struggle to survive against deadly threats from naval warships and other bloodthirsty pirates. During their misadventures the crew of the Revenge cross paths with notorious pirate captain Edward Teach and his crew, including First Mate Izzy Hands. Bonnet and Teach eventually fall in love.

Cast

Main
 Rhys Darby as Stede Bonnet, a wealthy Barbadian aristocrat who, growing tired of his sedentary life and unhappy marriage, abandons his family to begin a life of piracy despite having no aptitude for it. After purchasing a ship and hiring a crew, he seeks to brand himself as the Gentleman Pirate. Rhys Darby's son Theo Darby plays Stede Bonnet as a child.
 Taika Waititi as Edward "Ed" Teach / Blackbeard, the legendary and feared pirate captain who has become bored with his life and career, feeling that his reputation has made it too easy. He becomes fascinated with Bonnet after hearing about him from his first mate Izzy, and decides to seek him out. Mateo Gallegos plays Edward Teach as a child.
 Ewen Bremner as Nathaniel Buttons, the grizzled first mate on the Revenge whom Stede often calls upon for advice and is capable of talking with seagulls.
 Con O'Neill as Israel "Izzy" Hands, Blackbeard's ruthless first mate.
 Joel Fry as Frenchie, a crewmate on the Revenge who often sings of the crew's adventures.
 Samson Kayo as Oluwande Boodhari, a level-headed crewmate on the Revenge who is sympathetic to Stede and tries to steer him away from danger.
 Nathan Foad as Lucius Spriggs, a scribe on the Revenge tasked with keeping a record of its adventures who often helps Stede come to terms with his feelings.
 Vico Ortiz as Jim Jimenez (previously known as Bonifacia), a skilled fighter who has a bounty on their head for killing one of Spanish Jackie's husbands. With their friend Oluwande's help, they join the crew of the Revenge in disguise and posing as a mute. Allyson Juliette plays Jim as a child.
 Kristian Nairn as Wee John Feeney, a crewmate on the Revenge obsessed with fire.
 Matthew Maher as Black Pete, an irritable pirate aboard the Revenge who claims to have crewed with Blackbeard.
 Guz Khan as Ivan, a member of Blackbeard's crew who joins him on the Revenge.
 David Fane as Fang, a member of Blackbeard's crew who joins him on the Revenge.
 Rory Kinnear as Captain Nigel Badminton, a British naval captain who bullied Stede when they were children. Kinnear also plays Nigel's twin brother, Admiral Chauncey Badminton.
 Nat Faxon as The Swede, a Swedish crewmate on the Revenge, often clueless of what's going on.
 Samba Schutte as Roach, the ship's cook and doctor on the Revenge.

Supporting
 Leslie Jones as Spanish Jackie, a powerful and feared pirate captain with 19 husbands.
 Fred Armisen as Geraldo, a shifty barkeep in the Republic of Pirates and one of Jackie's husbands.
 Claudia O'Doherty as Mary Bonnet, Stede's wife.
 Boris McGiver as Father Bonnet, Stede's emotionally abusive father.
 Gary Farmer as Chief Mabo, an Indigenous leader who is wary of colonizers. 
 Kristen Schaal as Antoinette, a French aristocrat and Gabriel's partner/sister
 Nick Kroll as Gabriel, a French aristocrat and Antoinette's partner/brother
 Tim Heidecker as Doug, Mary's painting instructor and lover.
 Kristen Johnston as The Widow Evelyn Higgins, Mary's friend.
 Yvonne Zima as Fleur de Maguis, a French aristocrat.
 Will Arnett as Calico Jack, a recently deposed pirate captain and former friend of Blackbeard.
 Angus Sampson as King George
 Eden Grace Redfield as Alma Bonnet, Stede and Mary's daughter.
 William Barber-Holler as Louis Bonnet, Stede and Mary's son.
 Michael Patrick Crane as Officer Wellington, a member of the British navy who's taken hostage by Stede's crew.
 Connor Barrett as Officer Hornberry, a member of the British navy who's taken hostage by Stede's crew.
 Benton Jennings as the Anglican Priest who droningly performs Mary and Stede's marriage ceremony near a lighthouse.
 Damien Gerard as Father Teach, Blackbeard's father.
 Simone Kessell as Mother Teach, Blackbeard's mother.
 Selenis Leyva as “Nana”, a nun from St. Augustine who was Jim's guardian and mentor.
 Brian Gattas as Siegfried, The German Prince.

Episodes

Production

Development
Creator and showrunner David Jenkins was inspired to write the show after learning about Stede Bonnet from his wife and subsequently reading his Wikipedia article. He was particularly interested in filling in the blanks of Bonnet's life, trying to find his motivations for abandoning his family as well as understanding why Blackbeard took him under his wing.  From the outset he envisioned the show as centring on a romantic relationship between Bonnet and Blackbeard, and pitched it as such.

Taika Waititi, who shares a manager with Jenkins, became involved after Jenkins told him the story of Stede Bonnet and asked if he wanted to be involved. Waititi was attracted to the project because of what he believed to be Jenkins' original approach to pirates. In subsequent discussions they agreed that a romance between Bonnet and Teach was "the reason to do the show". Garrett Basch later joined the project as executive producer after reading the script for the pilot episode.

The show was given a straight to series order by HBO Max in September 2020 with Jenkins, Basch and Halstead as executive producers, and Waititi as both an executive producer and director of the first episode. On June 1, 2022, the series was renewed for a second season.

Casting
Casting an actor to play Stede Bonnet began shortly after the series was ordered. While Rhys Darby's name was mentioned early in the process, it was not until after an unsuccessful round of auditions and most of the script had been written that he was again brought into consideration. His casting was officially announced in January 2021. Jenkins stated that Darby made an otherwise unlikable Stede Bonnet likeable, telling Slash Film that he was "the only person who could play it". Darby, whose career has consisted primarily of supporting comedic roles, saw the role as an opportunity to branch out and play a leading, and more dramatic role, telling Deadline "I looked at myself and how much experience I've had over the years and I felt maybe it is time to step up."

Taika Waititi, who was already attached as executive producer and director, joined the cast to play Blackbeard four months later in April 2021. Jenkins had begun writing the role with Waititi in mind, and eventually approached him over text asking if he would be interested in playing Blackbeard. In the official casting announcement Jenkins said of Waititi "Our Blackbeard is a legend, a lover, a fighter, a tactical genius, a poetic soul and quite possibly insane. Only one man could play this role, and that is the great Taika Waititi. We're thrilled beyond measure he's decided to don the beard."

In June, Kristian Nairn, Nathan Foad, Samson Kayo, Rory Kinnear, Con O'Neill and Vico Ortiz were added to the cast, with Ewen Bremner, David Fane, Joel Fry, Guz Khan and Matthew Maher added in July. Leslie Jones, Nat Faxon, Fred Armisen and Samba Schutte would be cast in recurring roles in August.

Filming
Filming took place between June 14 and September 28, 2021. Taika Waititi, who serves as an executive producer, also directed the pilot episode, which was filmed after Waititi completed production on Thor: Love and Thunder. The scenes aboard the Revenge were filmed on a soundstage using StageCraft.

The second season began filming on September 25, 2022, in New Zealand. It wrapped on December 13, 2022.

Music 
The original score for the series was composed by Mark Mothersbaugh. On May 5, 2022, it was announced that the soundtrack album for the first season would be released by WaterTower Music on May 6, 2022.

Release
The series debuted on HBO Max on March 3, 2022. The first season ended on HBO Max on March 24, 2022.

In the United Kingdom the series first aired on BBC Two on January 4, 2023, at 10pm, with one episode airing each week. In addition, after the first episode aired every episode was available to watch or download via the BBC's iPlayer.

Reception

Critical response
The review aggregator website Rotten Tomatoes reported a 93% approval rating with an average rating of 7.70/10, based on 44 critic reviews. The website's critics consensus reads, "Our Flag Means Deaths gentle sensibility doesn't quite strike comedic gold, but its bemusing band of buccaneers are endearing enough that viewers seeking a comforting watch will find bountiful booty." Metacritic gave the first season a weighted average score of 70 out of 100 based on 13 critic reviews, indicating "generally favorable reviews".

The series has garnered praise for its substantial LGBTQ+ representation, which consists of three queer relationships, one of which involves a nonbinary character (Jim Jimenez). The central romance of the show, between Bonnet and Teach, was originally believed by many to be a "friendship". It has also been praised for its subversion of the common trope of queerbaiting by making their relationship explicit before the end of the season.

Viewership
Viewership and audience demand steadily increased during the three weeks between the series debut and season one finale. According to data science company Parrot Analytics, which measures audience demand based on streaming views, consumer research and social media engagement, Our Flag Means Death became the most in-demand breakout series in the U.S. following the release of season 1 episodes 9 and 10. The series unseated The Book of Boba Fett, which had claimed the top spot for three months. Our Flag Means Death held the top spot as the most in-demand breakout series across all streaming platforms in the U.S. for seven consecutive weeks. It was surpassed by the premiere of Star Trek: Strange New Worlds, but regained the top spot the following week.

Our Flag Means Death is considered an organic word of mouth success due to an active online fandom that continues to drive viewership and demand.  Its growing rise in popularity through word of mouth marketing has been compared to Ted Lasso’s.

Accolades

References

External links

2020s American LGBT-related comedy television series
2020s American romantic comedy television series
2022 American television series debuts
Cultural depictions of Blackbeard
Cultural depictions of Stede Bonnet
Fiction set in 1717
Gay-related television shows
HBO Max original programming
Productions using StageCraft
Television series set in the 18th century
Television series about pirates
Television shows filmed in Los Angeles